Joseph T. Gardi (March 2, 1939 – June 2, 2010) was an American football coach. He served as the head football coach at Hofstra University for 16 seasons, from 1990 to 2005, compiling a record of 119–62–2.

Early life
Gardi was raised in Harrison, New Jersey where he attended Harrison High School. While there, he was named a first-team all-state offensive guard as a senior in 1955.

He attended the University of Maryland, where he played football from 1959 to 1960 as an offensive tackle and linebacker. He served as a team co-captain and received the Unsung Hero Award. He graduated with a bachelor of science degree in business administration.

In 1960, he was signed by the Washington Redskins of the National Football League (NFL). He played in two pre-season games before being released. In 1961, he attended camp with the Buffalo Bills, but did not make the team.

Coaching career

High school
In 1964, he was hired as the head football coach for the Oratory Preparatory School in Summit, New Jersey. The team had lost 37 consecutive games prior to Gardi's arrival. In his first season, they again recorded a winless season with a 0–9 record. The following years he compiled 6–3 and 5–4 seasons, for a combined 11–16 record. In 1967, he took over as head coach at Roselle Park High School. That team had not secured a winning season in the previous decade. In his first season Gardi's team compiled a 2–7 record, followed by 6–3 and 9–0 records. In 1969, he coached the team to the New Jersey state championship.

Maryland
In 1970, Gardi returned to his alma mater to assume the roles of assistant head coach for the freshman team and recruiting coordinator. That year, he was responsible for recruiting future star quarterback, Bob Avellini. In 1972, he was promoted to the offensive line coach. In 1973, after new head coach Jerry Claiborne took over at Maryland, he retained Gardi and moved him to wide receivers coach.

Professional football
In 1974, Gardi began a tenure in the short-lived World Football League. He served as a running backs coach, special teams coach, and interim head coach for the Philadelphia Bell. In 1975, he served as head coach for the Portland Thunder for three games before the league disbanded.

Gardi then served from 1976 to 1984 as an assistant coach for the New York Jets in the NFL. In 1976, he was special teams and tight ends coach under head coach Lou Holtz. Gardi served as special teams and linebackers coach from 1977 to 1980. In 1981 and 1982, he was the defensive coordinator under head coach Walt Michaels. In his first year running the defense, the Jets allowed 304 yards per game, a conference best, and posted 66 tackles, the highest in the NFL. The following season, the Jets participated in the AFC Championship Game, where they lost to the Miami Dolphins. In 1983, Gardi was also named assistant head coach to Joe Walton.

From 1985 to 1990, Gardi served as an NFL assistant supervisor of officials, which included training and supervision of the league's officiating staff.

Hofstra
He returned to coaching in 1990 when he took the head position at Hofstra University. In his first season, he led his team to a 10–0 regular season and advanced to the Division III playoffs, where they lost in the semifinals. In 1991, Hofstra began the transition process to Division I-AA competition, and played six I-AA opponents and recorded an 8–2 record. The following season they played seven I-AA opponents and compiled a 4–6 record. The 1993 season was Hofstra's first as a full-fledged Division I team, and Gardi's team posted a 6–3–1 record. In 1994, they finished 8–1–1 and were ranked 22nd in the nation. In 1995, Hofstra lost in the first round of the playoffs to finish with a 10–2 record and a number-ten national ranking. In both 1998 and 1999, Hofstra again advanced to the I-AA quarterfinals, and finished with a fifth and seventh ranking, respectively. Hofstra was an Atlantic 10 Conference co-championship and top-ten ranked team in 2001. The 2005 season was Gardi's last and he finished his career at Hofstra having compiled a 119–62–2 record.

Later life
Gardi was inducted into the Suffolk Sports Hall of Fame on Long Island in the Basketball Category with the Class of 2000. He retired from coaching for good after the 2005 season. Gardi died on June 3, 2010 from complications related to an earlier stroke. During his coaching career, he had helped develop future NFL players such as Wayne Chrebet, Lance Schulters, Marques Colston, Willie Colon, and Raheem Morris.

Head coaching record

College

References

1939 births
2010 deaths
American football linebackers
American football offensive guards
American football offensive tackles
Buffalo Bills players
Hofstra Pride football coaches
Maryland Terrapins football coaches
Maryland Terrapins football players
National Football League defensive coordinators
New York Jets coaches
Philadelphia Bell coaches
Portland Thunder (WFL) coaches
Washington Redskins players
High school football coaches in New Jersey
People from Harrison, New Jersey
Sportspeople from Hudson County, New Jersey
Coaches of American football from New Jersey
Players of American football from New Jersey
American people of Italian descent